Unlike many languages, Icelandic has only very minor dialectal differences in sounds. The language has both monophthongs and diphthongs, and many consonants can be voiced or unvoiced.

Icelandic has an aspiration contrast between plosives, rather than a voicing contrast, similar to Faroese, Danish and Standard Mandarin. Preaspirated voiceless stops are also common. However, fricative and sonorant consonant phonemes exhibit regular contrasts in voice, including in nasals (rare in the world's languages). Additionally, length is contrastive for consonants, but not vowels. In Icelandic, the main stress is always on the first syllable.

Consonants

The number and nature of the consonant phonemes in modern Icelandic is subject to broad disagreement, due to a complex relationship among consonant allophones.

Major allophones

Even the number of major allophones is subject to some dispute, although less than for phonemes.  The following is a chart of potentially contrastive phones (important phonetic distinctions which minimally contrast in some positions with known phonemes; not a chart of actual phonemes), according to one analysis :

{| class="wikitable" style="margin: 1em auto 1em auto; text-align: center;"
|+Consonant phones
! colspan="2" |
! colspan="2" | Labial
! colspan="2" | Coronal
! colspan="2" | Palatal
! colspan="2" | Velar
! Glottal
|-
! colspan="2" | Nasal
| style="border-right: 0;" |  || style="border-left: 0;" | 
| style="border-right: 0;" |  || style="border-left: 0;" | 
| style="border-right: 0;" |  || style="border-left: 0;" | 
| style="border-right: 0;" |  || style="border-left: 0;" | 
|
|-
! colspan="2" | Stop
| style="border-right: 0;" |  || style="border-left: 0;" | 
| style="border-right: 0;" |  || style="border-left: 0;" | 
| style="border-right: 0;" |  || style="border-left: 0;" | 
| style="border-right: 0;" |  || style="border-left: 0;" | 
|
|-
! rowspan="2" | Continuant
! sibilant
| colspan="2" |
| style="border-right: 0;" |  || style="border-left: 0;" |
| colspan="2" |
| colspan="2" |
|
|-
! non-sibilant
| style="border-right: 0;" |  || style="border-left: 0;" | 
| style="border-right: 0;" |  || style="border-left: 0;" | 
| style="border-right: 0;" |  || style="border-left: 0;" | 
| style="border-right: 0;" |  || style="border-left: 0;" | 
| 
|-
! colspan="2" | Lateral
| colspan="2" |
| style="border-right: 0;"|  || style="border-left: 0;" | 
| colspan="2" |
| colspan="2" |
|
|-
! colspan="2" | Rhotic
| colspan="2" |
| style="border-right: 0;" |  || style="border-left: 0;" |  
| colspan="2" |
| colspan="2" |
|
|}

  are alveolar , whereas  are dental .
  is an apical alveolar sibilant fricative, whereas  are alveolar non-sibilant fricatives . The former is laminal, while the latter is usually apical.
 Voiceless continuants  are always constrictive , but voiced continuants  are not very constrictive and are often closer to approximants  than fricatives .  ( in particular is equivalent to canonical , but  and its allophones are not a rhotic consonant in Icelandic.)
 The rhotic consonants may either be trills  or taps , depending on the speaker.
 Acoustic analysis reveals that the voiceless lateral approximant  is, in practice, usually realized with considerable frication, especially word-finally or syllable-finally, i. e., essentially as a voiceless alveolar lateral fricative .

 includes three extra phones, namely the glottal stop , voiceless velarized alveolar lateral approximant  and its voiced counterpart .

A large number of competing analyses have been proposed for Icelandic phonemes.  The problems stem from complex but regular alternations and mergers among the above phones in various positions.

Alternations
Examples of alternations across different positions:

: tæp  ('uncertain' ), tæpt  ('uncertain' )
: grafa  ('to dig'); grafta  ('of diggings'); grafna  ('dug')
: segi  ('[I] say'), sagt  ('[was] said'), sagði  ('[I] said'), sagna  ('of stories')

Voiced consonants are devoiced word-finally before a pause, so that dag ('day (acc.)') is pronounced , bauð ('bid (1/3 pers. sg. past)') is pronounced , and gaf ('gave (1/3 pers. sg.)') is pronounced . Even sonorants can be affected: dagur  ('day (nom.sg.)'), ketil  ('kettle (acc.)')

Restrictions

Dorsal consonants (velar, palatal, glottal)

The "glottal fricative"  (actually a placeless approximant) only occurs initially before a vowel, and following a vowel in the sequences .  These latter sequences are sometimes said to be unitary "pre-aspirated" stops; see below.

There are two sets of palatal sounds. "Alternating palatals"  alternate with the velars , while "non-alternating palatals"  do not.  Note that  appears twice here; these two 's behave differently, occur in different distributions, and are denoted by different letters (g and j).  This suggests that they may belong to different phonemes, and that is indeed a common analysis.

In general, the alternating palatals  are restricted to appearing before vowels.  Velars  are restricted to appearing everywhere except before front vowels.  In other words: Before back vowels and front rounded vowels, both palatals and velars can appear; before front unrounded vowels only palatals can appear; before consonants only velars can appear.

For the non-alternating palatals : Both can appear at the beginning of a word, followed by a vowel.  Elsewhere, only one can occur, which must occur after a non-velar, non-palatal consonant.   occurs before a vowel, and  occurs in a few words at the end of a word following .

The velars and alternating palatals are distributed as follows:
Initially or at beginning of syllable: Only the four stops  can appear.
After  that begins a syllable: only .
Between vowels: only .
After a vowel, finally or before  or : only .
After a vowel, before : only .
After a vowel, before : only .
After a vowel, before nasals: only .
After a vowel, before : only .

Although the facts are complex, it can be noticed that  only ever contrasts with one of the two velar stops, never with both, and hence can be taken as an allophone of whichever one doesn't appear in a given context.

Alveolar non-sibilant fricatives
Some loanwords (mostly from Classical Greek) have introduced the phone  in intervocalic environments, as in Aþena  ('Athens').

The phone  is actually a laminal voiceless alveolar non-sibilant fricative . The corresponding voiced phone  is similar, but is apical rather than laminal .

Voiceless sonorants
Of the voiceless sonorants , only  occur in word-initial position, for example in hné  ('knee').  Only in initial position do the voiceless sonorants contrast with the corresponding voiced sonorants. Finally, before aspirated consonants and after voiceless consonants only the voiceless sonorants appear; elsewhere, only the voiced sonorants appear.  This makes it clear that  are non-phonemic. Recently, there has been an increasing tendency, especially among children, to pronounce initial hn as voiced, e.g. hnífur  ('knife') rather than standard .

Palatal and velar nasals

Aspiration and length contrasts (medial and final)

Modern Icelandic is often said to have a rare kind of stops, the so-called pre-aspirated stops  (e.g. löpp  'foot'), which occur only after a vowel and do not contrast with sequences  (which do not occur in Icelandic).   note that phonetically, in Icelandic pre-aspirated stops the aspiration is longer than in normal post-aspirated stops, and is indistinguishable from sequences  (or with  replacing ) occurring in other languages; hence, they prefer to analyze the pre-aspirated stops as sequences. For example, Icelandic nótt, dóttir correspond to German Nacht, Tochter.

Following vowels there is a complex alternation among consonant length, vowel length and aspiration.  The following table shows the alternations in medial and final position :

{| class="wikitable"
|+ Aspiration and length contrasts (medial and final)
! Bilabial !! Dental !! Velar
|-
| koppar 'small pot'
| gættir 'doorway'
| sakka 'sinkstone'
|-
| kobbar 'young seal'
| gæddir 'endow' (  past)
| sagga 'dampness'
|-
| kopar 'copper'
| gætir 'can' (  past )
| saka 'to blame'
|-
| opna 'open' (vb)
| gætnir 'careful'
| sakna 'to miss'
|-
| kapp 'zeal'
| vítt 'wide'
| dökk 'dark'
|-
| gabb 'hoax'
| vídd 'breadth'
| dögg 'dew'
|-
| gap 'opening'
| bít 'bite'
| tök 'grasps'
|}

In most analyses, consonant length is seen as phonemic while vowel length is seen as determined entirely by environment, with long vowels occurring in stressed syllables before single consonants and before certain sequences formed of a consonant plus , and short vowels occurring elsewhere.  Note that diphthongs also occur long and short.

Phonemes

As discussed above, the phones , probably , and debatably  are non-phonemic.  Beyond this, there is a great deal of debate both about the number and identity of the phonemes in Icelandic and the mapping between phonemes and allophones.

There are a number of different approaches:

Phonetic vs. orthographic:

The "phonetic" approach. This approach tries to stay as close as possible to the phonetics.
The "orthographic" approach (e.g. ). This approach takes the orthography (i.e. the spelling) as approximately indicative of the underlying phonemes. Note that in this approach, a particular phone will often be an allophone of different phonemes depending on context; e.g.  would be taken as  initially, but  between vowels.

Maximalist vs. minimalist:

The "maximalist" approach. This approach generally takes the contrasting phones as unit phonemes unless there is a good reason not to.
The "minimalist" approach. This approach analyzes phones as clusters whenever possible, in order to reduce the number of phonemes and (in some cases) better account for alternations. This would assume, for example, that the palatal stops, voiceless sonorants and velar nasal  are phonemic clusters, in accordance with the orthography. In structuralist analyses, which passed out of vogue starting in the 1960s as generative approaches took off, even more extreme minimalist approaches were common.

The main advantage of the phonetic approach is its simplicity compared with the orthographic approach.  A major disadvantage, however, is that it results in a large number of unexplained lexical and grammatical alternations.  Under the orthographic approach, for example (especially if a minimalist approach is also adopted), all words with the root sag-/seg- ('say') have a phonemic , despite the varying phones  occurring in different lexical and inflectional forms, and similarly all words with the root sak- ('blame') have a phonemic , despite the varying phones .  Under the phonetic approach, however, the phonemes would vary depending on the context in complicated and seemingly arbitrary ways.  Similarly, an orthographic analysis of three words for "white", hvítur hvít hvítt  ( sg,  sg) as  allows for a simple analysis of the forms as a root  plus endings  and successfully explains the surface alternation , which would not be possible in a strictly phonetic approach.

Assuming a basically orthographic approach, the set of phonemes in Icelandic is as follows:

{| class="wikitable" style="margin: 1em auto 1em auto; text-align: center;"
|+Consonant phonemes
! colspan="2" |
! colspan="2" | Labial
! colspan="2" | Coronal
! colspan="2" | Palatal
! colspan="2" | Velar
! Glottal
|-
! colspan="2" | Nasal
| style="border-right: 0;" |   || style="border-left: 0;" | 
| style="border-right: 0;" | || style="border-left: 0;" | 
| style="border-right: 0;" |   || style="border-left: 0;" |  
| style="border-right: 0;" |   || style="border-left: 0;" |
|
|-
! colspan="2" | Stop
| style="border-right: 0;" |  || style="border-left: 0;" | 
| style="border-right: 0;" |  || style="border-left: 0;" | 
| style="border-right: 0;" | || style="border-left: 0;" |
| style="border-right: 0;" |  || style="border-left: 0;" | 
|
|-
! rowspan="2" | Continuant
! sibilant
| colspan="2" |
| style="border-right: 0;" |  || style="border-left: 0;" |
| colspan="2" |
| colspan="2" |
|
|-
! non-sibilant
| style="border-right: 0;" |  || style="border-left: 0;" | 
| style="border-right: 0;" |  || style="border-left: 0;" |  
| style="border-right: 0;" | || style="border-left: 0;" | 
| style="border-right: 0;" |   || style="border-left: 0;" |  
| 
|-
! colspan="2" | Lateral
| colspan="2" |
| style="border-right: 0;"| || style="border-left: 0;" | 
| colspan="2" |
| colspan="2" |
|
|-
! colspan="2" | Tap or trill
| colspan="2" |
| style="border-right: 0;" | || style="border-left: 0;" |  
| colspan="2" |
| colspan="2" |
|
|}

The parentheses indicate phonemes present in a maximalist analysis but not a minimalist analysis.

The maximalist approach accords with the presence of minimal pairs like gjóla  ('light wind') vs. góla  ('howl') and kjóla  ('dresses') vs. kóla  ('cola'), along with general speakers' intuitions. On the other hand, the number of such alternations is not as great as for stop vs. fricative alternations; most lexical items consistently have either velars or palatals.

The voiceless sonorants are straightforwardly taken as allophones of voiced sonorants in most positions, because of lack of any contrast; similarly for  vs. .

The velar nasal  is clearly an allophone of  before a velar stop.

Vowels

There is less disagreement over the vowel phonemes in Icelandic than the consonant phonemes. The Old Icelandic vowel system involving phonemic length was transformed to the modern system where phonetic length is automatically determined by the syllable structure.  In the process of eliminating vowel length, however, relatively few vowel distinctions have been lost, as the loss of phonemic length has been offset by an increase in the number of quality distinctions and diphthongs.

Monophthongs 
{| class="wikitable" style="text-align: center;"
!
! Front
! Central
! Back
|-
! Close
| 
| 
| 
|-
! Near-close
| 
| 
|
|-
! Mid
| 
| 
| 
|-
! Open
| 
| 
| 
|}

  are similar to the respective cardinal vowels .
  are phonetically near-close .
  are true-mid monophthongs  when short and opening diphthongs  (also transcribed as ) when long. The long allophones are typically transcribed , also in this article.
  are traditionally indicated with rounded front vowel symbols, but they are actually rounded central vowels closer in backness to  respectively.   in particular is very close to a true schwa , but rounded.  This article uses the symbols .

Diphthongs 

 Whereas the monophthong  is a central vowel , the diphthong  has a true front onset,  (which can also be represented as ), while the diphthong  has a back onset, .  This article uses the common symbol  for both onsets.
 The diphthongs  do not exist outside certain sound reflexes and are effectively allophones of  respectively rather than true phonemes.

"Thin" and "broad" vowels 
Traditionally, though, the two primary divisions of Icelandic vowels are not monophthongs and diphthongs, but "thin" (or grönn) and "broad" (or breið) vowels.
 "Thin" vowels include the monophthongs , but not the close monophthongs .
 "Broad" vowels include all vowels that end in a close vowel, including the close monophthongs  as well as all diphthongs .
These distinctions are involved in certain productive phonotactic processes in the standard language, especially where "thin" vowels are strengthened to "broad" vowel counterparts before gi and before ng or nk.

Vowel length 
Vowel length is mostly predictable in Icelandic . Stressed vowels (both monophthongs and diphthongs) are long:
In one-syllable words where the vowel is word-final:
fá  ('get')
nei  ('no')
þú  ('you' singular)
Before a single consonant:
fara  ('go')
hás  ('hoarse')
ég  ('I')
spyr  ('I ask')
This is often shortened to the rule: If the first of the consonants is one of p, t, k, s and the second is one of j, v, r, then the vowel is long. This is known as the ptks+jvr-rule.
lipra  ('agile' accusative feminine)
sætra  ('sweet' genitive plural)
akra  ('fields' accusative plural)
hásra  ('hoarse' genitive plural)
vepja  ('lapwing')
letja  ('dissuade')
vekja  ('awaken')
Esja  ('Esja')
götva  as in uppgötva ('discover')
vökva  ('water' verb)
g shows a peculiar behavior. If we have the combination V+gi, then the vowel V is short and the gi is then pronounced . In the combinations V+g+V (the second vowel not being i) the first vowel is long and g is pronounced . An example: logi  ('flame', nominative singular) vs. logar  ('flames', nominative plural)
Before other consonant clusters (including the preaspirated stops  and geminate consonants), stressed vowels are short. Unstressed vowels are always short.
Karl  ('Carl')
standa  ('stand')
sjálfur  ('self')
kenna  ('teach')
fínt  ('fine')
loft  ('air')
upp  ('up')
yrði  as in nýyrði ('neologism')
ætla  ('will' verb)
laust  ('loose')
An exception occurs if there is a t before the infix k. Examples are e. g. notkun and litka. There are also additional exceptions like um and fram where the vowel is short in spite of rules and en, where the vowel length depends on the context.

Reflexes between consonants and vowels 
A variety of phonotactic processes govern how Icelandic consonants and vowels assimilate with each other in speech.

Palatalization of velars 
If any of the velar consonant sequences k g kk gg nk ng occur immediately before any of the front vowels  or the consonant 
j , and usually also before the diphthong æ , then the sequences' velar phones change into their corresponding palatal phones.  In the case of j, the  coalesces into the resulting palatal consonants and disappears.  The velar phones remain velar before any of the non-front vowels , as well as before certain instances of the diphthong  in foreign loanwords like gæd  'guide'.

Vowels before gi 
In the standard dialect, vowels immediately before gi  within the same morpheme are pronounced phonetically short instead of phonetically long.  Additionally, of these vowels, the monophthongs  change into corresponding -ending short diphthongs , and  changes into  itself.  This is the only usual circumstance in Icelandic where the diphthong phones  can occur.  This process does not occur in some dialects of southern Iceland, where the vowel may remain phonetically long and not change.

Vowels before ng and nk 
In the standard dialect, before any of the palatal or velar nasal consonants  (which occur in the spellings ng and nk), the monophthongs  become certain diphthongs , and the mid-close monophthongs  become corresponding close monophthongs .  Existing diphthongs  and existing close monophthongs  are not affected.  Since ng and nk are consonant clusters that cannot occur at the beginning of a word or morpheme, all vowels immediately before them can only be phonetically short.  This process does not occur in some dialects of the Westfjords.

Aspiration 
In the standard dialect, the voiceless plosive phonemes p t k are normally postaspirated as  if they occur at the beginning of a morpheme, but are never postaspirated in the non-initial position within a morpheme and are instead pronounced .  In particular, this makes the consonant pairs p/b and t/d homophones between vowels within a morpheme, though b and d tend not to occur in this position in Icelandic words inherited from Old Norse anyway.  The aspiration does not always completely disappear, though:
 Geminated sequences pp tt kk within a morpheme become preaspirated .
 Any of the sequences pn pl tn tl kn kl after a vowel within a morpheme become preaspirated .

Among Iceland's dialects, this feature is the most common surviving deviation from the standard dialect. This does not affect the sequences rp rt rk lt within a morpheme, which all dialects pronounce like the standard dialect.

References

Bibliography

 

 

 
Kennslubók í Nútíma Íslensku handa Ítölum by Riccardo Venturi (Rikarður V. Albertsson)

Phonology
Germanic phonologies